The 1957 Abant earthquake occurred at 8:33am on 26 May, in Turkey. The earthquake had an estimated surface wave magnitude of 7.1 and a maximum felt intensity of IX (Violent) on the Mercalli intensity scale, causing 52 fatalities and 101 injuries. Five thousand homes were damaged as a result of the earthquake.

See also
 List of earthquakes in 1957
 List of earthquakes in Turkey

References

External links

1957 Abant
1957 earthquakes
1957 in Turkey
History of Bolu Province
May 1957 events in Europe
1957 disasters in Turkey